Colin Malcolm Macrae Simpson (14 July 1931 - 31 October 2017) was a war correspondent and investigative journalist for The Sunday Times. He also wrote a number of non-fiction books. After an accident, he became a keen gardener and started the business Simpson's Seeds.

Selected publications
 Sir Francis Chichester: Voyage of the Century. Sphere, London, 1967. (With Christopher Angeloglou)
 The Secret Lives of Lawrence of Arabia. Nelson, London, 1969. (With Phillip Knightley)
 The Ship That Hunted Itself. Weidenfeld and Nicolson, London, 1971.
 Lusitania. Little, Brown and Company, 1972. 
 The Cleveland Street Affair. Little Brown, 1976. (With Lewis Chester & David Leitch)
 Mugabe: A Biography. Sphere, London, 1981. (With David Smith) 
 Emma: The Life of Lady Hamilton. Bodley Head, London, 1983. 
 The Partnership: The Secret Association of Bernard Berenson and Joseph Duveen. Bodley Head, London, 1987.

References 

1931 births
2017 deaths
University of Helsinki alumni
People educated at Wellington College, Berkshire
English biographers
English journalists
British investigative journalists
English horticulturists
English non-fiction writers
Royal Scots Fusiliers officers
Graduates of the Royal Military Academy Sandhurst